The Original Caste is a Canadian folk group. The band formed in Calgary, Alberta, Canada, in 1966 under the name The North Country Singers.  Because the name sounded too much like a folk group, it was changed in 1968. Instrumentally, the group consists of guitar, keyboard and bass.

History
Songwriter and guitarist Bruce Innes formed the group in Calgary, Alberta, in 1966.  Initially, Bruce Innes, Graham Bruce and Bliss Mackie worked as a trio and Dixie Lee (Stone) Innes joined the group in 1967, contributing rich vocals. At that time, Dixie Lee Stone was a secretary at Pacific Petroleums in Calgary, and she sang on the weekly television programme Calgary Safety Roundup on CFCN-TV. Bruce Innes sang and played by himself while Graham Bruce worked as an accounts executive at Royal Trust. Bliss Mackie had worked as a Coca-Cola truck driver and a manager of a department store. In early 1968 Peter Brown (Seattle) became the first drummer in the group. Joe Cavender played with an acid rock group.

In 1968, the band moved to Los Angeles and recorded the single "I Can’t Make It Anymore" for Dot Records with limited success. In 1969, the band signed with TA Records, a label distributed by Bell Records. The band did write many of their pieces but the writing and production team of Dennis Lambert and Brian Potter wrote and produced The Original Caste's two hit singles: "One Tin Soldier" and then "Mr. Monday"; both songs were from the 1969 LP One Tin Soldier. The songs employ the use of strings, horns, and organ which adds a swinging, pop-friendly sound. "One Tin Soldier" was a hit in Canada and reached No. 34 on the U.S. Billboard Hot 100 chart in 1970. The follow-up single, "Mr. Monday", was a big hit in Japan and Canada but not in the United States. The two singles combined, worldwide, sold over three million copies and were certified gold in both Canada and Japan. The band toured extensively in Canada, the United States and Japan and made many television appearances. The band's success allowed them the opportunity to open for both B. B. King and Glen Campbell. Having amassed a large following in Japan, they toured there and recorded live albums, in addition to releasing several further Japanese singles.

The initial members of The Original Caste separated in 1972 with Graham Bruce and Bliss Mackie parting. Married couple Bruce and Dixie Innes continued to perform as The Original Caste and released songs with an increased country influence, including the full-length album Back Home. The Original Caste finally split in 1980 as Bruce and Dixie divorced. Innes continues to perform as a solo artist and later revived the band name in the new millennium.

"One Tin Soldier" was revived in 1971 when the song was featured on the Billy Jack movie soundtrack; this version was performed by Jinx Dawson of the rock band Coven along with the studio's orchestra. This recording was released to radio, then retracted; Coven later released a version on an album. Both versions billed as being by Coven were based on substantially the original arrangement, though some cover versions diverged widely. The popularity of the song has endured as very diverse covers have been recorded by punk rock group Me First and the Gimme Gimmes and by Sonny and Cher; Roseanne Barr also recorded a parody of the song.

A strophic ballad, "One Tin Soldier" tells the tale of the materialistic "valley-people" who kill and cheat in search of a rumoured treasure on a mountain. The only treasure, though, is a stone inscribed with "Peace on earth"; ironically, the valley-people, a metaphor for mankind, destroyed this treasure whilst in the pursuit of it. The song ends with a repetition of the chorus which is a common arrangement technique used to engrain a song in the listener's memory.

Members
Bruce Innes - Lead Guitar; Keyboard, and Vocals. Founder and Current Member.  While in college, Innes played guitar with blues legend Josh White. In the late 1970s Innes worked on John Denver's Rocky Mountain High album and supplied songs to Ray Stevens and Mickey Gilley. Upon the band's final split, Innes began jingle and film score work. In 2003 Bruce Innes and Ian Tyson produced WMA Album of the Year for country artist Brenn Hill. Innes is remarried and currently resides in Alberta.
Julian Kerr - Guitar; Keyboard; Vocals
Shelley Jones - Lead Vocals
Bruce Mohacsy - Bass; Vocals; Keyboard
Lori Mohacsy - Vocals

Past members 
Dixie Lee (Stone) Innes - Vocals.  After her divorce from Bruce Innes, Dixie left the music industry and found a new career as a social worker, living in Victoria, British Columbia.
Bliss Mackie - Rhythm Guitar and Vocals.
Graham Bruce - Bass
Peter Brown - Drums; jazz drummer and classical percussionist, currently performing and teaching in Skagit County, WA.
Joseph Cavender - Drums; replaced Brown in 1970
Gary Carlson - Bass; replaced Bruce in 1972
Dennis Coats - Rhythm Guitar; replaced Mackie in 1972
Richard Harrow - Later addition
Glenn Mundy - Later addition
John Dunn - Later addition
Cheryl Morrell - Vocals; performed with in 2005
Jilla Roberts - Vocals; performed with in 2006–2009

Discography

Albums

Singles

References

External links
 
 Music Featured on the Simpsons at Snpp.com
 Original Caste, The at CANOE -- JAM! Music - Pop Encyclopedia
 The Original Caste Home Page at Yesterday's Pop Music Club
 
 

Canadian folk rock groups